Florian Hahn (born 14 March 1974) is a German politician of the Christian Social Union (CSU) who has been serving as a member of the Bundestag from the state of Bavaria since 2009.

Early career 
From 2006 until 2009, Hahn worked on public relations at defence company Krauss-Maffei Wegmann (KMW) in Munich.

Political career 
Hahn joined the Young Union (JU) in 1989.

Hahn first became a member of the Bundestag in the 2009 German federal election. He is a member of the Committee on European Union Affairs and the Defence Committee.

In the negotiations to form a Grand Coalition of Chancellor Angela Merkel's Christian Democrats and the Social Democrats (SPD) following the 2013 federal elections, Rachel Hahn part of the CDU/CSU delegation in the working group on education and research policy, led by Johanna Wanka and Doris Ahnen. In similar negotiations following the 2017 federal elections, he was part of the working group on European affairs, led by Peter Altmaier, Alexander Dobrindt and Achim Post. He has been the CDU/CSU's parliamentary group's spokesperson on European affairs (2018-2021) and defense (since 2021).

Since 2019, Hahn has been serving as Deputy Secretary General of the CSU, under the leadership of chairman Markus Söder. That year, he co-chaired the CSU’s convention in Munich, alongside Markus Blume and Thomas Silberhorn.

Other activities

Corporate boards 
 IABG, Member of the Supervisory Board (2010–2017)
 Quantum-Systems, Member of the Advisory Board (–2017)

Non-profit organizations 
 European Academy of Bavaria, Member of the Board of Trustees
 Federal Academy for Security Policy (BAKS), Member of the Advisory Board (since 2018)
 Institute for European Politics (IEP), Member of the Board of Trustees 
 Max Planck Institute for Astrophysics, Member of the Board of Trustees
 Max Planck Institute for Extraterrestrial Physics, Member of the Board of Trustees
 Munich Aerospace, Member of the Board of Trustees

Political positions 
In June 2017, Hahn voted against Germany's introduction of same-sex marriage.

In a joint letter initiated by Norbert Röttgen and Anthony Gonzalez ahead of the 47th G7 summit in 2021, Hahn joined some 70 legislators from Europe, the US and Japan in calling upon their leaders to take a tough stance on China and to "avoid becoming dependent" on the country for technology including artificial intelligence and 5G.

References

External links 

  
 Bundestag biography 

1974 births
Living people
Members of the Bundestag for Bavaria
Members of the Bundestag 2021–2025
Members of the Bundestag 2017–2021
Members of the Bundestag 2013–2017
Members of the Bundestag 2009–2013
Politicians from Munich
Members of the Bundestag for the Christian Social Union in Bavaria